The women's super combined competition of the Vancouver 2010 Paralympics is held at Whistler Blackcomb in Whistler, British Columbia. The competition has been rescheduled to Sunday March 21 due to recent weather conditions.

It was the first time super combined was arranged in the Paralympics.

Visually impaired
In the combined visually impaired, the athlete with a visual impairment has a sighted guide. The two skiers are considered a team, and dual medals are awarded.

Sitting

Standing

See also
Alpine skiing at the 2010 Winter Olympics

References 

Alpine Skiing – Sports – Vancouver 2010 
Alpine Skiing Schedule 

Women's combined
Para